Duck sauce (or orange sauce) is a condiment with a sweet and sour flavor and a translucent orange appearance similar to a thin jelly. Offered at American Chinese restaurants, it is used as a dip for deep-fried dishes such as wonton strips, spring rolls, egg rolls, duck, chicken, fish, or with rice or noodles. It is often provided in single-serving packets along with soy sauce, mustard, hot sauce or red chili powder. It may be used as a glaze on foods, such as poultry. Despite its name, the sauce is not prepared using duck meat; rather it is named as such because it is a common accompaniment to Chinese-style duck dishes.

Ingredients
It is made of plums, apricots, pineapples or peaches added to sugar, vinegar, ginger and chili peppers. It is used in more traditional Chinese cuisine in the form of plum sauce.

Name

It is speculated that the name "duck sauce" came about because its ancestor, tianmian sauce, was first served with Peking duck in China. When the Chinese emigrated to the U.S., they created Chinese dishes that would appeal more to the American palate, and developed a sweeter version of the sauce used in China.

See also

 List of dips
 Hoisin sauce
 List of condiments
 List of sauces
 Oyster sauce
 Plum sauce
 Siu haau sauce (primary Chinese BBQ sauce)
 Sweet and sour sauce
 Tianmian sauce

References

Chinese condiments
Sauces